Nicholas Peacock was a farmer from Limerick, who kept a diary from the years 1740 to 1751. It was a detailed account of his daily life and work, living in the townlands of Kilcorly and Kilmoreen, Adare.

His diary was described by his editor as "a valuable record of the day to day life of a man living at a level of Irish society of which we know little or nothing. This diary is one of the most complex and detailed accounts existing of life in rural Ireland in the mid-eighteenth century."

Family

He was the son of Nicholas Peacock Senior and Ann Pike, whose known children were Robert, Nicholas, Anne (wife of Courcey Ireland), Mrs. Edward McGan, and Mary (who died in 1743).

Peacock married Catherine Chapman of Lisdogan, County Cork, in 1747, and had at least three children. His son eldest son, Price, was born in 1748, and a Price Peacock of Kilmoreen was listed as a freeholder there in 1766. Their two other sons, George and William, were born in 1749 and 1750.

References

External links
 http://www.fourcourtspress.ie/product.php?intProductID=295

Year of birth missing
Year of death missing
Writers from County Limerick
Irish diarists
Irish farmers